Nemuroglanis is a genus of three-barbeled catfishes. With the exception of N. panamensis from Panama, they are native to tropical South America.

Species
There are currently five recognized species in this genus:
 Nemuroglanis furcatus F. R. V. Ribeiro, Pedroza & Rapp Py-Daniel, 2011
 Nemuroglanis lanceolatus C. H. Eigenmann & R. S. Eigenmann, 1889
 Nemuroglanis mariai (L. P. Schultz, 1944)
 Nemuroglanis panamensis (W. A. Bussing, 1970)
 Nemuroglanis pauciradiatus Ferraris, 1988

References

Heptapteridae
Catfish genera
Taxa named by Carl H. Eigenmann
Taxa named by Rosa Smith Eigenmann
Freshwater fish genera